The 2020 season was Haugesund's 27th  competitive season in the clubs history. During this season they competed in the Eliteserien.

Season events
On 12 June, the Norwegian Football Federation announced that a maximum of 200 home fans would be allowed to attend the upcoming seasons matches.

On 10 September, the Norwegian Football Federation cancelled the 2020 Norwegian Cup due to the COVID-19 pandemic in Norway.

On 30 September, the Minister of Culture and Gender Equality, Abid Raja, announced that clubs would be able to have crowds of 600 at games from 12 October.

On 14 October, Haugesund's matches against Viking were postponed due to the Viking squad having to isolate after Veton Berisha tested positive for COVID-19, eventually being rearranged for 27 October.

Squad

Out on loan

Transfers

In

Loans in

Out

Loans out

Released

Friendlies

Competitions

Eliteserien

Results summary

Results by round

Results

Table

Norwegian Cup

Squad statistics

Appearances and goals

|-
|colspan="14"|Players away from Haugesund on loan:

|-
|colspan="14"|Players who appeared for Haugesund no longer at the club:

|}

Goal scorers

Clean sheets

Disciplinary record

References

 

FK Haugesund seasons
Haugesund